Naapa (Naaba), or Nawa Sherpa, is a Tibetic language of Nepal (and one village in China) closely related to Dzongkha of Bhutan. Speakers live among Lhomi speakers.

References

Languages of Nepal
South Bodish languages